

31 August 2008 (Sunday)
Auto racing:
World Rally Championship:
Rally New Zealand in Taupo, New Zealand
(1) Sébastien Loeb  (2) Dani Sordo  (3) Mikko Hirvonen 
World Touring Car Championship season: Motorsport Arena Oschersleben at Oschersleben, Germany
Race 1: (1) Augusto Farfus  (2) Robert Huff  (3) Alain Menu 
Race 2: (1) Félix Porteiro  (2) Tom Coronel  (3) Robert Huff 
Deutsche Tourenwagen Masters: Round 8 at Brands Hatch, Kent, United Kingdom
(1) Timo Scheider  (2) Paul di Resta  (3) Mattias Ekström 
IndyCar:
Detroit Indy Grand Prix at Belle Isle Park, Detroit, Michigan, United States:
(1) Justin Wilson  (2) Hélio Castroneves  (3) Tony Kanaan 
NASCAR Sprint Cup:
Pepsi 500 at Auto Club Speedway in Fontana, California, United States
(1) Jimmie Johnson  (2) Greg Biffle  (3) Denny Hamlin 
 Johnson not only wins, but becomes one of three drivers to clinch spots in the Chase for the Sprint Cup. Johnson, Dale Earnhardt Jr. and Jeff Burton will join Kyle Busch and Carl Edwards in the Chase. Biffle and Kevin Harvick effectively clinch spots in the Chase; both need only to start in next week's race at Richmond to make the Chase.
Cricket
South African cricket team in England in 2008
4th ODI: 137/3 (17.4/20 ov) beat  183/6 (32.1 ov) by 7 wickets(D/L)
Motorcycle racing:
Moto GP:
San Marino and Rimini's Coast motorcycle Grand Prix at Misano World Circuit, Misano Adriatico, Italy:
(1) Valentino Rossi  (2) Jorge Lorenzo  (3) Toni Elías

30 August 2008 (Saturday)
Cricket:
Bangladesh cricket team in Australia in 2008
1st ODI: 254/8 (50 ov) beat  74 (27.4 ov) by 180 runs
Rugby union:
Tri Nations Series:
 53–8  at Johannesburg
 The Boks score their biggest win ever over the Wallabies. Jongi Nokwe becomes the first Springbok to score four tries against the Wallabies. Immediately after the match, Percy Montgomery, the all-time caps and points leader for South Africa, announces his retirement from international rugby.

29 August 2008 (Friday)

28 August 2008 (Thursday)
American football:
After having been suspended by the NFL for the 2007 season, Dallas Cowboys cornerback Adam Jones is fully reinstated for the upcoming season. (ESPN.com)
Tennis:
US Open in New York City:
 Ana Ivanovic , the #1-ranked woman and top seed, becomes the first top seed in the open era to lose in the second round of the US Open, losing 6–3, 4–6, 6–3 to #188 Julie Coin .

27 August 2008 (Wednesday)

26 August 2008 (Tuesday)

25 August 2008 (Monday)

24 August 2008 (Sunday)
American football:
The New York Giants announce that defensive end Osi Umenyiora will miss the 2008 season with a knee injury. (AP via Yahoo)
Auto racing:
Formula One:
European Grand Prix at the Valencia Street Circuit, Valencia, Spain:
(1) Felipe Massa  (2) Lewis Hamilton  (3) Robert Kubica 
IndyCar:
Peak Antifreeze & Motor Oil Indy Grand Prix at Infineon Raceway, Sonoma, California, United States:
(1) Hélio Castroneves  (2) Ryan Briscoe  (3) Tony Kanaan 
FIA GT Championship:
Bucharest 2 Hours, at Bucharest Ring, Bucharest, Romania:
(1) Jean-Denis Délétraz  & Marcel Fässler  (2) Mike Hezemans  & Fabrizio Gollin  (3) Andrea Bertolini  & Michael Bartels 
Baseball:
2008 Little League World Series:
 Waipahu, Hawaii 12,  Matamoros, Mexico 3
2008 Summer Olympics in Beijing
Athletics
Men's Marathon
 Samuel Kamau Wanjiru 2:06:32,  Jaouad Gharib 2:07:16,  Tsegay Kebede 2:10:00
The olympics officially close with the conclusion of the closing ceremony.

23 August 2008 (Saturday)
2008 Summer Olympics in Beijing, China
Athletics
Men's 4x400 metre relay
 (LaShawn Merritt, Angelo Taylor, David Neville, Jeremy Wariner) 2:55.39,  (Andretti Bain, Michael Mathieu, Andrae Williams, Chris Brown) 2:58.03,  (Maksim Dyldin, Vladislav Frolov, Anton Kokorin, Denis Alexeev) 2:58.06
Men's 800 metres
 Wilfred Bungei 1:44.65,  Ismail Ahmed Ismail 1:44.70,  Alfred Kirwa Yego 1:44.82
Men's 5000 metres
 Kenenisa Bekele 12:57.82,  Eliud Kipchoge 13:02.80,  Edwin Cheruiyot Soi 13:06.22
Men's javelin throw
 Andreas Thorkildsen 90.57 m,  Ainārs Kovals 86.64 m,  Tero Pitkämäki 86.16
Women's 4x400 metre relay
 (Mary Wineberg, Allyson Felix, Monique Henderson, Sanya Richards) 3:18.54,  (Yulia Gushchina, Lyudmila Litvinova, Tatyana Firova, Anastasiya Kapachinskaya) 3:18.82,  (Novelene Williams, Shereefa Lloyd, Rosemarie Whyte, Shericka Williams) 3:20.40
Women's 1500 metres
 Nancy Lagat 4:00.23,  Iryna Lishchynska 4:01.63,  Nataliya Tobias 4:01.78
Women's high jump
 Tia Hellebaut 2.05 m,  Blanka Vlašić 2.05 m,  Anna Chicherova 2.03 m
Auto racing:
NASCAR Sprint Cup:
Sharpie 500 at Bristol Motor Speedway in Bristol, Tennessee, United States
(1) Carl Edwards  (2) Kyle Busch  (3) Denny Hamlin 
Rugby union:
Tri Nations Series:
 15–27  at Durban

22 August 2008 (Friday)
2008 Summer Olympics in Beijing, China
Athletics
Men's 4x100 metre relay
 (Nesta Carter, Michael Frater, Usain Bolt, Asafa Powell) 37.10,  (Keston Bledman, Marc Burns, Emmanuel Callender, Richard Thompson) 38.06,  (Naoki Tsukahara, Shingo Suetsugu, Shinji Takahira, Nobuharu Asahara) 38.15
Men's 50 kilometre walk
 Alex Schwazer 3:37:09,  Jared Tallent 3:39:27,  Denis Nizhegorodov 3:40:14
Men's decathlon
 Bryan Clay 8791,  Andrei Krauchanka 8551,  Leonel Suárez 8527
Men's pole vault
 Steven Hooker 5.96 m,  Yevgeny Lukyanenko 5.85 m,  Denys Yurchenko 5.70 m
Women's 4x100 metre relay
 (Evgeniya Polyakova, Aleksandra Fedoriva, Yulia Gushchina, Yuliya Chermoshanskaya) 42.31,  (Olivia Borlée, Hanna Mariën, Élodie Ouédraogo, Kim Gevaert) 42.54,  (Franca Idoko, Gloria Kemasuode, Halimat Ismaila, Oludamola Osayomi) 43.04
Women's 5000 metres
 Tirunesh Dibaba 15:41.40,  Elvan Abeylegesse 15:42.74,  Meseret Defar 15:44.12
Women's long jump
 Maurren Higa Maggi 7.04 m,  Tatyana Lebedeva 7.03 m,  Blessing Okagbare 6.01 m

21 August 2008 (Thursday)
2008 Summer Olympics in Beijing, China
Athletics
Men's 110 metre hurdles
 Dayron Robles 12.93,  David Payne 13.17,  David Oliver 13.18
Men's 400 metres
 LaShawn Merritt 43.75,  Jeremy Wariner 44.74,  David Neville 44.80
Men's triple jump
 Nelson Évora 17.67 m,  Phillips Idowu 17.62 m,  Leevan Sands 17.59 m
Women's 20 kilometre walk
 Olga Kaniskina 1:26:31,  Kjersti Plätzer 1:27:07,  Elisa Rigaudo 1:27:12
Women's 200 metres
 Veronica Campbell-Brown 21.74,  Allyson Felix 21.93,  Kerron Stewart 22.00
Women's javelin throw
 Barbora Špotáková 71.42 m,  Mariya Abakumova 70.78 m,  Christina Obergföll 66.13 m
Cricket
2008 Associates Tri-Series in Canada
 159/4 (39.5 ov) beat  158/9 (50 ov) by 6 wickets

20 August 2008 (Wednesday)
2008 Summer Olympics in Beijing, China
Athletics
Men's 200 metres
 Usain Bolt 19.30,  Shawn Crawford 19.96,  Walter Dix 19.98
Usain Bolt sets a new world record in men's 200 metres.
Women's 400 metre hurdles
 Melaine Walker 52.64,  Sheena Tosta 53.70,  Tasha Danvers 53.84
Women's hammer throw
 Aksana Miankova 76.34 m,  Yipsi Moreno 75.20 m,  Zhang Wenxiu 74.32 m
Basketball:
Olympic men's tournament: Qualifying teams to the semifinals in bold.
 72–59 
 94–68 
 116–85 
 80–78 
Basketball
PBA Fiesta Conference Finals:
Barangay Ginebra Kings 97, Air21 Express 84, Ginebra wins series, 4–3.
American football: National Football League
Gene Upshaw, a hall-of-fame guard and the long-time Executive Director of the National Football League Players Association, dies of pancreatic cancer at the age of 63.  He was diagnosed just on August 17.
Cricket
Indian cricket team in Sri Lanka in 2008
 143/7 (39.4 ov) beat  142 (38.3 ov) by 3 wickets

19 August 2008 (Tuesday)
2008 Summer Olympics
Athletics
Men's 1500 metres
 Rashid Ramzi 3:32.94,  Asbel Kipruto Kiprop 3:33.11,  Nicholas Willis 3:34.16
Men's discus throw
 Gerd Kanter 68.82 m,  Piotr Małachowski 67.82 m,  Virgilijus Alekna 67.79 m
Men's high jump
 Andrey Silnov 2.36 m,  Germaine Mason 2.34 m,  Yaroslav Rybakov 2.34 m
Women's 100 metre hurdles
 Dawn Harper 12.54,  Sally McLellan 12.64,  Priscilla Lopes-Schliep 12.64
Women's 400 metres
 Christine Ohuruogu 49.62,  Shericka Williams 49.69,  Sanya Richards 49.93
Basketball
Women's tournament: Qualifying teams to the semifinals in bold.
 77–62 
 79–46 
 104–60 
 65–84

18 August 2008 (Monday)
2008 Summer Olympics in Beijing, China
Athletics
Men's 400 metre hurdles
 Angelo Taylor 47.25,  Kerron Clement 47.98,  Bershawn Jackson 48.06
Men's 3000 metre steeplechase
 Brimin Kiprop Kipruto 8:10.34,  Mahiedine Mekhissi-Benabbad 8:10.49,  Richard Kipkemboi Mateelong 8:11.01
Men's long jump
 Irving Saladino 8.34 m,  Khotso Mokoena 8.24 m,  Ibrahim Camejo 8.20 m
Women's 800 metres
 Pamela Jelimo 1:54.87,  Janeth Jepkosgei 1:56.07,  Hasna Benhassi 1:56.73
Women's discus throw
 Stephanie Brown-Trafton 64.74 m,  Yarelis Barrios 63.64 m,  Olena Antonova 62.59 m
Women's pole vault
 Yelena Isinbayeva 5.05 m,  Jennifer Stuczynski 4.80 m,  Svetlana Feofanova 4.75 m
Yelena Isinbayeva sets a new world record in women's pole vault.
Basketball
Men's tournament:
Group A:  57–91 
Group A:  106–65 
Group A:  91–79 
Group B:  91–77 
Group B:  50–98 
Group B:  106–57 
Cricket:
Indian cricket team in Sri Lanka in 2008
1st ODI: 147/2 (34.5 ov) beat  146 (46 ov) by 8 wickets
English cricket team in Scotland in 2008
Only ODI: 156/9 (44/50 ov) vs  10/0 (2.3/44 ov)-No result.
2008 Associates Tri-Series in Canada
 260/7 (50 ov) beat  235/8 (50 ov) by 25 runs

17 August 2008 (Sunday)
2008 Summer Olympics in Beijing, China
Athletics
Men's Hammer Throw
 Primož Kozmus 82.02 m,  Vadim Devyatovskiy 81.61 m,  Ivan Tsikhan 81.51 m.
Men's 10000 metres
 Kenenisa Bekele 27:01.17,  Sileshi Sihine 27:02.77,  Micah Kogo 27:04.11
Women's 100 metres
 Shelly-Ann Fraser 10.78,  Sherone Simpson 10.98,  Kerron Stewart 10.98.
Women's 3000 metre steeplechase
 Gulnara Samitova-Galkina 8:51.8,  Eunice Jepkorir 9:07.41,  Yekaterina Volkova 9:07.64
Gulnara Samitova-Galkina sets a new world record in women's 3000 metre steeplechase.
Women's Marathon
 Constantina Diṭă-Tomescu 2:26:44,  Catherine Ndereba 2:27:06,  Chunxiu Zhou 2:27:07
Women's Triple Jump
 Françoise Mbango Etone 15.39 m,  Tatyana Lebedeva 15.32 m,  Hrysopiyí Devetzí 15.23 m
Françoise Mbango Etone sets a new olympic record in women's triple jump.
Basketball
Women's tournament: Qualifying teams to the knockout stage in bold.
Group A:  75–55 
Group A:  72–68 
Group A:  68–53 
Group B:  47–79 
Group B:  79–63 
Group B:  60–96 
Auto racing:
NASCAR Sprint Cup:
3M Performance 400 at Michigan International Speedway in Brooklyn, Michigan, United States
(1) Carl Edwards  (2) Kyle Busch  (3) David Ragan 
World Rally Championship:
Rallye Deutschland in Trier, Germany
(1) Sébastien Loeb  (2) Dani Sordo  (3) François Duval 
Motorcycle racing:
Moto GP:
Czech Republic motorcycle Grand Prix at Masaryk Circuit, Brno, Czech Republic:
(1) Valentino Rossi  (2) Toni Elías  (3) Loris Capirossi

16 August 2008 (Saturday)
2008 Summer Olympics in Beijing, China
Athletics
Men's 20 kilometre walk
 Valeriy Borchin 1:19:01,  Jefferson Pérez 1:19:15,  Jared Tallent 1:19:42.
Men's 100 metres
 Usain Bolt 9.69,  Richard Thompson 9.89,  Walter Dix 9.91
Usain Bolt sets a new 100m world record.
Women's Heptathlon
 Nataliya Dobrynska 6733,  Hyleas Fountain 6619,  Tatyana Chernova 6591.
Women's shot put
 Valerie Vili 20.56 m,  Natallia Mikhnevich 20.28 m,  Nadzeya Astapchuk 19.86 m.
Badminton
Men's doubles
Semifinals
 Markis Kido/ Hendra Setiawan def  Lars Paaske/ Jonas Rasmussen 21–19, 21–17
 Fu Haifeng/ Cai Yun def  Lee Jae-jin/ Hwang Ji-man 22–20, 21–8
Finals
 Markis Kido/ Hendra Setiawan def  Fu Haifeng/ Cai Yun 12–21, 21–11, 21–16
3rd Place
 Lee Jae-jin/ Hwang Ji-man def  Lars Paaske/ Jonas Rasmussen 13–21, 21–18, 21–17
Women's Singles
Semifinals
 Xie Xingfang def  Lu Lan 7–21, 21–10, 21–12
 Zhang Ning def  Maria Kristin Yulianti 21–15, 21–15
Finals
 Zhang Ning def  Xie Xingfang 21–12, 10–21, 21–18
3rd Place
 Maria Kristin Yulianti def  Lu Lan 11–21, 21–13, 21–15
Basketball
Men's tournament: Qualifying teams to the knockout stage in bold.
Group A:  80–95 
Group A:  76–86 
Group A:  82–97 
Group B:  102–61 
Group B:  59–55 
Group B:  82–119 
Rugby union:
Tri Nations Series:
 0–19  at Cape Town
Springbok Percy Montgomery became the ninth player to make his 100th international appearance.

15 August 2008 (Friday)
2008 Summer Olympics in Beijing, China
Archery
Men's Individual
Quarterfinals
Juan René Serrano  113–106  Vic Wunderle
Park Kyung-Mo  108(+19)–108(+17)  Juan Carlos Stevens
Viktor Ruban  115–106  Moriya Ryuichi
Bair Badënov  109–104  Cheng Chu Sian
Semifinals
Park Kyung-Mo  115–112  Juan René Serrano
Viktor Ruban  112(+20)–112(+18)  Bair Badënov
Finals
Viktor Ruban  113–112  Park Kyung-Mo
3rd Place
Bair Badënov  115–110  Juan René Serrano
Athletics
Men's Shot Put
 Tomasz Majewski 21.51 m,  Christian Cantwell 21.09 m,  Andrei Mikhnevich 21.05 m.
Women's 10000 metres
 Tirunesh Dibaba 29:54.66,  Elvan Abeylegesse 29:56.34,  Shalane Flanagan 30:22.22.
Tirunesh Dibaba sets a new Olympic record beating the previous record of 30:17.49.
Badminton
Women's doubles
Semifinals
 Lee Kyung-won/ Lee Hyo-jung def.  Miyuki Maeda/ Satoko Suetsuna 22–20, 21–15
 Du Jing/ Yu Yang def.  Zhang Yawen/ Wei Yili 21–19, 21–12
Finals
 Du Jing/ Yu Yang def.  Lee Kyung-won/ Lee Hyo-jung 21–15, 21–13
3rd Place
 Zhang Yawen/ Wei Yili def.  Miyuki Maeda/ Satoko Suetsuna 21–17, 21–10
Basketball
Women's tournament: Qualifying teams to the knockout stage in bold.
Group A:  73–96 
Group A:  74–64 
Group A:  53–63 
Group B:  90–59 
Group B:  69–48 
Group B:  93–55

14 August 2008 (Thursday)
2008 Summer Olympics in Beijing, China
Archery
Women's Individual
Quarterfinals
Park Sung-hyun  112–103  Nami Hayakawa
Kwon Un Sil  105–99  Mariana Avitia
Zhang Juanjuan  106–101  Joo Hyun-Jung
Yun Ok-Hee  111–105  Khatuna Lorig
Semifinals
Park Sung-hyun  109–106  Kwon Un Sil
Zhang Juanjuan  115–109  Yun Ok-Hee
Finals
Zhang Juanjuan  110–109  Park Sung-hyun
3rd Place
Yun Ok-Hee  109–106  Kwon Un Sil
Basketball
Men's tournament: Qualifying teams to the knockout stage in bold.
Group A:  106–68 
Group A:  86–79 
Group A:  77–53 
Group B:  55–72 
Group B:  68–85 
Group B:  92–69

13 August 2008 (Wednesday)
2008 Summer Olympics in Beijing, China
Basketball – Olympics:
Women's tournament:
Group A:  65–71 
Group A:  78–79 
Group A:  90–62 
Group B:  74–55 
Group B:  80–63 
Group B:  41–97

12 August 2008 (Tuesday)
2008 Summer Olympics in Beijing, China
Basketball
Men's tournament:
Group A:  67–99 
Group A:  85–78 
Group A:  85–68 
Group B:  84–67 
Group B:  75–85  (OT)
With Yao Ming fouling out and Spain's Ricky Rubio's pesky defense against the Chinese backcourt, the world champions survive the hosts in overtime.
Group B:  76–97

11 August 2008 (Monday)
2008 Summer Olympics in Beijing, China
Archery
Men's Team
Quarterfinals
South Korea  224–222  Poland
China  217–219  Russia
Italy  218–213  Malaysia
Ukraine  214–211  Chinese Taipei
Semifinals
South Korea  221–218  China
Italy  223–221  Ukraine
Finals
South Korea  227–225  Italy
3rd Place
China  222–219  Ukraine
Basketball
Women's tournament:
Group A:  62–85 
Group A:  81–47 
Group B:  72–77 
Group B:  57–79 
Group B:  63–108 
Group A:  80–65 
Cricket
Indian cricket team in Sri Lanka in 2008
3rd Test: 396 (134.2 ov) & 123/2 (23.1 ov) beat  249 (80 ov) & 268 (87.5 ov) by 8 wickets
 wins the three test series 2–1.
South African cricket team in England in 2008
4th Test: 316 (95.2 ov) & 198/4 (52.5 ov) beat  194 (64.5 ov) & 318 (99.2 ov) by 6 wickets
 wins the four test series 2–1.

10 August 2008 (Sunday)
2008 Summer Olympics in Beijing, China
Archery
Women's Team
Quarterfinals
South Korea  231–217  Italy
France  218–211  Poland
China  211–206  India
Great Britain  201–196  Japan
Semifinals
South Korea  213–184  France
China  208–202  Great Britain
Finals
South Korea  224–215  China
3rd Place
France  203–201  Great Britain
Basketball
Men's tournament:
Group A:  71–49 
Group B:  95–66 
Group B:  81–66 
Group A:  79–75 
Linas Kleiza's three-pointer with 2.1 seconds left clinched the victory for the Lithuanians.
Group A:  82–97 
Group B:  101–70 
Auto racing:
NASCAR Sprint Cup:
Centurion Boats at the Glen at Watkins Glen International in Watkins Glen, New York, United States
(1) Kyle Busch  (2) Tony Stewart  (3) Marcos Ambrose 
 Busch clinches the top seed for the Chase for the Sprint Cup with four races remaining before the Chase. He also becomes the first driver in NASCAR history to win three road course races in a single season (two in the Sprint Cup and one in the Nationwide Series).
Golf:
PGA Tour and European Tour – PGA Championship in Bloomfield Hills, Michigan:
 In the last major of the year, Pádraig Harrington  shoots 4-under-par 66 to finish at 277 (−3), giving him a two-shot win over Ben Curtis  and Sergio García . The win gives Harrington his second consecutive major and third overall, and also makes him the first European to win the PGA Championship since 1930 and the first ever to win while residing outside the U.S.

9 August 2008 (Saturday)
Auto racing:
IRL:
Meijer Indy 300 at Kentucky Speedway in Sparta, Kentucky:
(1) Scott Dixon  (2) Hélio Castroneves  (3) Marco Andretti 
2008 Summer Olympics in Beijing, China
Basketball
Women's tournament:
Group A:  64–83 
Group B:  72–76 
Group B:  67–64 
Group A:  68–62  (OT)
Group B:  57–97 
Group A:  57–62 
Rugby union:
 63–9  in Johannesburg
 In a one-off Test, part of ongoing celebrations of Nelson Mandela's 90th birthday, the Pumas take an early 9–0 lead, but the Boks take over from there, running in nine tries, seven in the second half. The second-half onslaught is paced by JP Pietersen and Joe van Niekerk with two tries each.

8 August 2008 (Friday)
Cricket
Bermudian cricket team in the Netherlands in 2008
1st ODI: vs -Match abandoned without a ball bowled.
2008 Summer Olympics in Beijing
The Olympics officially starts with the lighting of the Olympic torch.

7 August 2008 (Thursday)

2008 Summer Olympics in Beijing, China:
Football (soccer):
Men:
Group A:  1–1 
Group A:  1–2 
Group B:  0–1 
Group B:  0–0 
Group C:  1–0 
Group C:  1–1 
Group D:  0–3 
Group D:  1–1 
Lacrosse:
 The sport's new unified governing body, the Federation of International Lacrosse (FIL), holds its first meeting. The FIL was formed by the merger of the former governing bodies for men's and women's lacrosse, respectively the International Lacrosse Federation and International Federation of Women's Lacrosse Associations.

6 August 2008 (Wednesday)

2008 Summer Olympics in Beijing, China:
Football (soccer):
Women:
Group E:  1–2 
Group E:  2–1 
Group F:  0–0 
Group F:  1–0 
Group G:  2–2 
Group G:  2–0 
 American football:
Quarterback Brett Favre was traded from the Green Bay Packers to the New York Jets for a draft pick that will increase in value depending on the Jets' results in 2008. (Fox Sports (USA))

5 August 2008 (Tuesday)
American football:
 After several hours of closed-door talks on Monday, Brett Favre leaves the Green Bay Packers' training camp today, and Packers coach Mike McCarthy says at a news conference that Favre's future is not with the team. Reportedly, the Packers have rejected a trade to another NFC North team, but a source indicates that Favre may be open to a trade to the Tampa Bay Buccaneers. (ESPN)
Cricket
2009 ICC World Twenty20 Qualifier
5th Place Final: 71/2 (10.3 ov) beat  70 (20 ov) by 8 wickets
1st Place Final: vs - Match abandoned with a toss.  and the  share the trophy.

4 August 2008 (Monday)

Cricket:
2009 ICC World Twenty20 Qualifier
1st Semifinal: 72/6 (19.1 ov) beat  67 (17.2 ov) by 4 wickets
2nd Semifinal: 110/5 (18 ov) beat  107/8 (20 ov) by 5 wickets
3rd Place Final: 107/1 (18.1 ov) beat  106/9 (20 ov) by 9 wickets

3 August 2008 (Sunday)

American football:
 The National Football League officially reinstates Brett Favre, who will end his brief retirement when he reports to the Green Bay Packers' training camp Monday.
Auto racing:
Formula One:
Hungarian Grand Prix at the Hungaroring, Mogyoród, Hungary:
(1) Heikki Kovalainen  (2) Timo Glock  (3) Kimi Räikkönen 
FIA GT Championship:
Spa 24 Hours, at Circuit de Spa-Francorchamps, Spa, Belgium:
(1) Andrea Bertolini , Michael Bartels , Stéphane Sarrazin  & Eric van de Poele  (2) Alexandre Sarnes Negrão , Miguel Ramos , Stéphane Lemeret  & Alessandro Pier Guidi  (3) Darren Turner , Allan Simonsen , Philipp Peter  & Andrew Thompson 
NASCAR Sprint Cup:
Pennsylvania 500 at Pocono Raceway in Long Pond, Pennsylvania, United States
(1) Carl Edwards  (2) Tony Stewart  (3) Jimmie Johnson 
V8 Supercar:
Round 8 at Winton Motor Raceway in Benalla, Victoria, Australia
(1) Garth Tander  (2) Jamie Whincup  (3) Will Davison 
World Rally Championship:
Rally Finland in Jyväskylä, Finland
(1) Sébastien Loeb  (2) Mikko Hirvonen  (3) Chris Atkinson 
Cricket:
India in Sri Lanka
2nd Test: 326 (82 ov) & 269 (76.2 ov) beat  292 (93.3 ov) & 136 (47.3 ov) by 170 runs
India levels the 3-match series 1–1
2009 ICC World Twenty20 Qualifier
Group A
 100/2 (17.4 ov) beat  99/7 (20 ov) by 8 wickets
 43/7 (9/20 ov) beat  41/8 (9/20 ov) by 4 runs (D/L)
Rain reduced match to 9 overs per side.
Group B
 92/6 (17.5 ov) beat  91 (19.4 ov) by 4 wickets
The two finalists automatically qualify for the 2009 ICC World Twenty20. The 3rd Place finisher may qualify if 's withdrawal from the tournament is confirmed.
Golf:
 PGA Tour and European Tour: Bridgestone Invitational in Akron, Ohio, USA
 Vijay Singh  holds off Stuart Appleby  and Lee Westwood  to defeat both by one shot, winning his first World Golf Championships individual event. Singh's 32nd career PGA Tour win gives him the all-time record for PGA Tour wins by a player born outside the U.S., surpassing English-born American Harry Cooper.
 LPGA: Women's British Open in Sunningdale, England
 In the final major of the LPGA season, Jiyai Shin  cruises to a three-shot win over Yani Tseng . Shin becomes the third golfer this year to collect her first LPGA win in a major.
Motorcycle racing:
Superbike:
Brands Hatch Superbike World Championship round at Brands Hatch, Kent, United Kingdom:
Race 1 (1) Ryuichi Kiyonari  (2) Troy Bayliss  (3) Max Biaggi 
Race 2 (1) Ryuichi Kiyonari  (2) Noriyuki Haga  (3) Troy Corser 
The meeting is marred by the death of 23-year-old British rider Craig Jones during the ninth round of the 2008 Supersport World Championship season.

2 August 2008 (Saturday)
Cricket:
South Africa in England
3rd Test: 314 (90.2 ov) & 283/5 (80 ov) beat  231 (77 ov) & 363 (98.2 ov) by 5 wickets
South Africa lead 2–0 and secures victory in the 4-match series
2009 ICC World Twenty20 Qualifier
Group A
 118/6 (19.5 ov) beat  117 (20 ov) by 4 wickets
Group B
 153/5 (20 ov) beat  134/9 (20 ov) by 19 runs
 98/6 (19.3 ov) beat  97 (18.4 ov) by 4 wickets
Rugby union:
Tri Nations Series:
 39–10  at Auckland
 The All Blacks secure a bonus-point win against the Wallabies to level the Bledisloe Cup series at one win apiece.

References

08